The Volinsky Lifeguard Regiment, more correctly translated as the Volhynian Life-Guards Regiment, was a Russian Imperial Guard infantry regiment. Created out of a single battalion of Finnish Guard Regiment in 1817, the regiment took part in the Polish-Russian War of 1830–1831, the Crimean War, the January Uprising of 1863 and the First World War.

History 

Unlike many older units of Imperial Russian Army, the Volinsky Regiment was neither attached to or originated from the land of Volhynia after which it was named. Instead, it traces its roots to a single Imperial Militia Battalion formed by Duke Constantine Pavlovich of Russia in Strelna on 12 December 1806 (Old Style). In the spring of the following year it took part in the Battle of Guttstadt-Deppen of the War of the Fourth Coalition. In 1807 it took part in the Battle of Friedland and in January of the following year was renamed to His Majesty's Guards Militia Battalion and then in April to His Majesty's Finnish Battalion. Reinforced and reorganised, in October 1811 the battalion was extended to become the Guards Finnish Regiment of three infantry battalions. The first battalion, still including many veterans of the original militia unit, was then mentioned in dispatches for its role in the Battle of Leipzig. Having suffered heavy losses, the battalion was retained in Russian-occupied Warsaw in 1814.

On 12 October 1817 (Old Style) the battalion was reorganised into the Volinsky Guards Regiment composed of two battalions of light infantry. Its main task was to serve as a personal guard of Grand Duke Constantine Pavlovich and to serve as a counterbalance to the forces of the Kingdom of Poland in case they mutinied. Due to the fact that the original battalion took part in most of the Napoleonic Wars, the new regiment inherited the rights of the "Old Guard" and was included into the Guards Corps rather than the general army.

The regiment took active part in many battles of the November Uprising, notably in the Battle of Ostrołęka, fights in Lithuania and the final battle of Warsaw. After the uprising, in 1832 the regiment was moved to Kronstadt near the new Russian capital of St. Petersburg, and then in 1836 to Oranienbaum. It took part in the fights on secondary theatres of the Crimean War of 1853–1856, mostly guarding the shores of the Baltic Sea against Charles John Napier's Baltic blockade and took part in a skirmish against a British boarding party at the port of Makslahti.

During the January Uprising the regiment was moved back to Poland and attached to the 2nd Brigade, 3rd Guards Infantry Division. The regiment remained there until the outbreak of World War I. It took part in the failed Russian invasion of East Prussia as part of the XXIII Army Corps, and then the inconclusive Battle of Łódź. In the summer of 1915 the regiment formed the core of General Vladimir Apollonovich Olokhov's ad-hoc Army Group unsuccessfully trying to cover the flanks of 3rd and 8th Armies during the Gorlice–Tarnów Offensive.

Withdrawn from the front to Sankt Petersburg, the soldiers of the regiment rebelled, killed their officers and took part in the Bolshevik Revolution. The forces of the regiment remained in Petersburg until October, when the unit was disbanded and its forces formed the core of the local Red Army units.

1917 mutiny 
On the morning of Sunday, 11 March 1917, Tsar Nicholas II had issued orders forbidding the populace from assembling in Petrograd. However, many people did and 200 were shot. When the Volinsky Regiment were ordered to fire at the unarmed crowd, they fired into the air. The next day the Volinsky Regiment mutinied and was quickly followed by the Semyonovsky, the Izmaylovsky, the  regiments, and even the legendary Preobrazhensky Regiment, the oldest and staunchest regiment founded by Peter the Great. The arsenal was pillaged, the Ministry of the Interior, Military Government building, police headquarters, the Law Courts and a score of police buildings were put to the torch. By noon the Peter and Paul Fortress with its heavy artillery was in the hands of the insurgents. By nightfall 60,000 soldiers had joined the revolution. 

Order broke down and members of the Parliament (Duma) formed a provisional government to try to restore order, but it was impossible to turn the tide of revolutionary change. The Duma and the Soviet had already formed the nucleus of a provisional government and decided that Nicholas must abdicate. Faced with this demand, which was echoed by his generals, deprived of loyal troops, with his family in the hands of the Russian Provisional Government and fearful of unleashing civil war and opening the way for a German conquest, Nicholas had no choice but to submit. At the end of the "February Revolution" of 1917 (February in the Old Russian calendar), on 2 March (Julian Calendar)/ 15 March (Gregorian Calendar) 1917, Nicholas II abdicated.

Gallery

See also

Russian Armed Forces

Sources 
Gorokhoff, Gerard. Russian Imperial Guard. 2002.
Handbook of the Russian Army 1914 by the British General Staff. Battery Press reprint edition, 1996.

Russian Imperial Guard
Infantry regiments of the Russian Empire
Russian military units and formations of the Napoleonic Wars
Former guards regiments
Military units and formations established in 1817
1817 establishments in the Russian Empire
Warsaw Governorate
Military units and formations disestablished in 1917
Guards regiments of the Russian Empire